Nicolas Hlava (born May 17, 1994) is a Czech professional ice hockey player. He currently plays with Piráti Chomutov in the Czech Extraliga.

Hlava made his Czech Extraliga debut playing with Piráti Chomutov debut during the 2013–14 Czech Extraliga season.

References

External links

1994 births
Living people
Czech ice hockey forwards
Piráti Chomutov players
HC Litvínov players
Sportspeople from Chomutov
Rytíři Kladno players
Sportovní Klub Kadaň players
Orli Znojmo players